The  is an electric multiple unit (EMU) train type operated by the Tokyo subway operator Tokyo Metro in Japan on the Tokyo Metro Ginza Line since April 2012.

The first trainset was delivered in September 2011 ahead of entry into revenue service from 11 April 2012, with full-production sets entering service from 2013.

Design
The design of the new 1000 series trains is a modern rendition of the original 1000 series trains, which were originally used on the Ginza Line when the line opened in 1927. The new 1000 series uses newly developed bogies with steerable axles to reduce flange noise on sharp curves.

The 1000 series trains use Toshiba-manufactured permanent magnet synchronous motors (PMSM), offering 20% energy savings compared to the VVVF inverter-controlled  motors used in earlier 01 series trains.

The trains are lit entirely with LED lights, including the headlights, offering energy savings of 40% when compared to fluorescent lighting. The LED lighting is supplied by Panasonic Electric Works.

The design was awarded the 2013 Blue Ribbon Award, presented annually by the Japan Railfan Club, and a presentation ceremony was held at Nakano Depot on 12 October 2013.

Formation
The sets are formed as follows, with car 1 at the Shibuya end and car 6 at the Asakusa end. Each car is motored, 

Car 6 in sets 1101 to 1121 was initially numbered in the "16xx" series, but they were renumbered in the "10xx" series between June and July 2015, and sets 1122 onward were delivered with cars already numbered in the "10xx" series.

Exterior
The trains are finished in a lemon yellow livery applied using vinyl sheets, evoking the appearance of the original 1000 series trains introduced on the line in 1927. Sets 1139 and 1140 were finished to more closely resemble the original 1000 series trains, with a single large front (LED) headlight.

Interior
Internally, the new trains feature 17-inch LCD passenger information displays above each door. Sets up to 1133 were delivered with two screens, while sets 1134 onwards have three screens, while all prior sets are being retrofitted with the three-screen layout. Luggage racks and strap handles have been lowered by  compared to the 01 series trains.

Sets 1139 and 1140 
Sets 1139 and 1140 have retro-style interiors, with brass-coloured handrails and wood-grain effect walls, to closely resemble the original 1000 series trains. The LED lighting in these two sets can be altered to give an old-fashioned tungsten-lighting effect when used on special-event services.

History

The first set was delivered from Nippon Sharyo in Toyokawa, Aichi on 17 September 2011. It entered service on the Ginza Line from 11 April 2012. The second set was delivered from Nippon Sharyo in April 2013. The 40th and final set entered service on 12 March 2017.

Fleet details

By 12 March 2017, all 40 sets were in operation. Official delivery dates as follows.

*Classic design

References

External links

  
 Nippon Sharyo 1000 series information 

Electric multiple units of Japan
1000 series
Train-related introductions in 2012
600 V DC multiple units
Nippon Sharyo multiple units